The Djibouti Museum  is a museum in Djibouti.

See also
List of museums in Djibouti
List of national museums

References

Museums with year of establishment missing
Museums in Djibouti
National museums